Per Egil Törnqvist (19 December 1932, Uppsala – 9 March 2015, Amsterdam) was Professor Emeritus of Scandinavian Studies at the University of Amsterdam and an academic literary critic.

Earlier (1961) he was in charge of the drama division in the comparative literature 
program at Uppsala University. From 1969 to 1997 he was professor of Scandinavian languages and literature at the University of Amsterdam. His daughter is artist Marit Törnqvist.

Books
(1968) "Drama of Souls: Studies in O'Neill's Super-naturalistic Technique."
(1970) "Drama of Souls", Yale University Press
(1982) "Strindbergian Drama"
(1991) "Transposing Drama Studies In Representat", 
(1993) "Filmdiktaren Ingmar Bergman"   
(1995) "Ibsen: A Doll's House (Plays in Production)", Cambridge University Press
(1999) "Ibsen, Strindberg and the Intimate Theater: Studies in TV Presentation"
(2003) "Bergman's Muses: Aesthetic Versatility in Film, Theatre, Television and Radio" 
(2004) "Strindberg's Ghost Sonata"
(2004) "Eugene O'Neill: A Playwright's Theatre"
(2008) "I Bergmans regi", Amsterdam Contributions to Scandinavian Studies, Vol. 5
(2008) (with Birgitta Steene) "Strindberg on Drama and Theatre"
(2008) "Between Stage and Screen: Ingmar Bergman Directs", Amsterdam University Press
(2018) (with Erik Mattsson), ”Strindberg’s Gustav Vasa and the Performance of Swedish Identity – from Celebration to Introspective Critique”, in Reconsidering National Plays in Europe. Springer International Publishing AG, 2018,

References

1932 births
2015 deaths
Swedish literary critics
Scandinavian studies scholars
Uppsala University alumni
Academic staff of Uppsala University
Academic staff of the University of Amsterdam
Swedish expatriates in the Netherlands
People from Uppsala
Burials at Uppsala old cemetery